Liocrobyla brachybotrys is a moth of the family Gracillariidae. It is known from Japan (Honshū and Kyūshū) and Korea.

The wingspan is 6–7 mm.

The larvae feed on Wisteria brachybotrys. They mine the leaves of their host plant. The mine has the form of an elongate or digitate blotch along the midrib. It is pale brown and bordered by pale green.

References

Gracillariinae
Moths of Japan